Cecil Bridgewater (born October 10, 1942) is an American jazz trumpeter.

Biography
Bridgewater was born in Urbana, Illinois and studied at the University of Illinois. He and brother Ron formed the Bridgewater Brothers Band in 1969, and in the 1970s he was married to Dee Dee Bridgewater. In 1970 he played with Horace Silver, and following this with Thad Jones and Mel Lewis from 1970 to 1976. Also in the 1970s he played with Max Roach, starting a decades-long association. Elsewhere he has played with  Dizzy Gillespie, Art Blakey, Randy Weston, Charles McPherson, Joe Henderson, Roy Brooks, Abdullah Ibrahim and Sam Rivers. Bridgewater's first disc as a leader appeared in 1993.  Bridgewater has also composed works premiered by the Cleveland Chamber Orchestra and Meet the Composer.

Cecil Bridgewater has become a great supporter of The Jazz Foundation of America in their mission to save the homes and the lives of America's elderly jazz and blues musicians including musicians that survived Hurricane Katrina. Cecil performed at the 2008 Benefit Concert, “A Great Night in Harlem”  at the World-famous Apollo Theater.

He currently teaches as adjunct faculty at Manhattan School of Music, New School, William Paterson University, and The Juilliard School.

Discography

As leader
I Love Your Smile (Blue Moon, 1992)
Mean What You Say (Brownstone, 1997)

As sideman
With Muhal Richard Abrams
The Hearinga Suite (Black Saint, 1989)
With Anthony Braxton
Creative Orchestra Music 1976 (Arista, 1976)
With Jon Faddis and Billy Harper
Jon & Billy (Trio, 1974)
With Frank Foster
The Loud Minority (Mainstream, 1972)
With O'Donel Levy
Dawn of a New Day (Groove Merchant, 1973)
Simba (Groove Merchant, 1974)
With Mel Lewis
Mel Lewis and Friends (A&M/Horizon, 1977)
With Charles McPherson
Today's Man (Mainstream, 1973)
With Jimmy Owens
Headin' Home (A&M/Horizon, 1978)
With Houston Person
Houston Express (Prestige, 1970) 
The Talk of the Town (Muse, 1987)
With Max Roach
Lift Every Voice and Sing (Atlantic, 1971)
Pictures in a Frame (Soul Note, 1979)
In the Light (Soul Note, 1982)
Live at Vielharmonie (Soul Note, 1983)
It's Christmas Again (Soul Note, 1984)
Easy Winners (Soul Note, 1985)
Bright Moments (Soul Note, 1986)
To the Max! (Enja, 1990–91)
With Horace Silver
Total Response (Blue Note, 1971)
All (Blue Note, 1972)
Both above albums compiled on The United States of Mind (Blue Note, 2004)
With Lonnie Liston Smith
Visions of a New World (RCA/Flying Dutchman, 1975)
With Dakota Staton
I Want a Country Man (Groove Merchant, 1973)
With John Stubblefield
Confessin' (Soul Note, 1984)
With Buddy Terry
Awareness (Mainstream, 1971)
With The Thad Jones / Mel Lewis Orchestra
Suite for Pops (A&M/Horizon, 1972)
Live in Tokyo (Denon Jazz, 1974)
Potpourri (Philadelphia International, 1974)
Thad Jones / Mel Lewis and Manuel De Sica (Pausa, 1974)
New Life (A&M/Horizon, 1976)
Thad Jones / Mel Lewis Orchestra With Rhoda Scott (Barclay, 1976)
With Mickey Tucker
Mister Mysterious (Muse, 1978)
With McCoy Tyner
Song of the New World (Milestone, 1973)
Inner Voices (Milestone, 1977)
With Dee Dee Bridgewater
Afro Blue (Trio, 1974)

References

American jazz trumpeters
American male trumpeters
Bebop trumpeters
Jazz musicians from Illinois
1942 births
Living people
People from Urbana, Illinois
21st-century trumpeters
21st-century American male musicians
American male jazz musicians
Manhattan School of Music faculty
The New School faculty
William Paterson University faculty
Juilliard School faculty
Jazz musicians from New York (state)